The giant pocket gopher (Orthogeomys grandis), also known as the Oaxacan pocket gopher, is a species of rodent in the family Geomyidae. It is found in Mexico, Guatemala, El Salvador and Honduras. It is the type species of the genus Orthogeomys; some zoologists also include in this genus species that have recently been placed in Heterogeomys.

References

Giant pocket gopher
Mammals of Mexico
Rodents of Central America
Rodents of North America
Giant pocket gopher
Giant pocket gopher
Least concern biota of North America
Taxonomy articles created by Polbot